Tolgullow is a hamlet near St Day in west Cornwall, England, United Kingdom. It is on the B3298 road to Gwennap.

References

Hamlets in Cornwall